Lisa M. Hansen is an American film producer, production manager, former actress, writer, and craft service person. She has worked in various genres, including thriller, action, drama, and science fiction.  She once frequently made cameos in the movies she has been involved with.

Life
Lisa Hansen grew up in Chicago, Illinois. She began her career in entertainment as a radio disc jockey in Gillette, Wyoming. Later on, she returned to Chicago to become program manager of Spectrum Pay-TV.

In 1981, Hansen was hired by Chicago Teleproductions, and in 1982, she was recruited by Paul Hertzberg, moving to Los Angeles with him to do sales for a new independent film studio called CineTel Films. Within a year, Hansen was promoted to vice president and then, the following year, to executive vice president.

In the early 1980s, Hansen and Hertzberg went to Cannes for the first time, attending would later become MIPCOM. During the festival, the two CineTel executives found themselves with entertainment shows that they "literally couldn't give away" with the exception of Hansen's film acquisition The Courier of Death, which sold out quickly; observing Hansen's success, CineTel Films switched its business focus from TV programming to feature film production—a turning point in the company's history.

In 1990, she was named president of the newly formed CineTel Pictures, located in Burbank, California. CineTel Pictures is a separate production from CineTel Films.

She is still the president of CineTel Pictures, Inc. and executive vice president of CineTel Films, Inc.

Filmography

References

External links

The CineTelFilms website

Living people
Year of birth missing (living people)
American film producers
American screenwriters
American film actresses
American women film producers
American women screenwriters
20th-century American actresses
21st-century American women